The following is a list of cinematographers who have won and been nominated for the American Society of Cinematographers Award for Outstanding Achievement in Theatrical Releases, which is given annually by the American Society of Cinematographers.

Winners and nominees

1980s

1990s

2000s

2010s

2020s

Multiple wins

5 wins
 Roger Deakins
 Emmanuel Lubezki (3 consecutive)

4 wins
 Conrad L. Hall

2 wins
 Allen Daviau
 John Toll
 Greig Fraser

Multiple nominations

17 nominations
 Roger Deakins

11 nominations
 Robert Richardson

6 nominations
 Janusz Kamiński
 Emmanuel Lubezki

5 nominations
 Bruno Delbonnel
 Conrad L. Hall
 John Schwartzman
 John Seale
 Dean Semler

4 nominations
 Chris Menges
 Rodrigo Prieto
 John Toll
 Haskell Wexler

3 nominations
 Dion Beebe
 Stephen H. Burum
 Caleb Deschanel
 Greig Fraser
 Darius Khondji
 Andrew Lesnie
 Claudio Miranda
 Phedon Papamichael
 Wally Pfister
 Philippe Rousselot
 Dante Spinotti

2 nominations
 Barry Ackroyd
 Danny Cohen
 Jeff Cronenweth
 Dean Cundey
 Allen Daviau
 Paweł Edelman
 Robert Elswit
 Stephen Goldblatt
 Adam Greenberg
 Edward Lachman
 Dan Laustsen
 Matthew Libatique
 Seamus McGarvey
 Tony Pierce-Roberts
 Dick Pope
 Linus Sandgren
 Vittorio Storaro
 Hoyte van Hoytema
 Dariusz Wolski
 Vilmos Zsigmond

See also
 AACTA Award for Best Cinematography
 Academy Award for Best Cinematography
 BAFTA Award for Best Cinematography
 Critics' Choice Movie Award for Best Cinematography
 Independent Spirit Award for Best Cinematography
 Satellite Award for Best Cinematography

References

American Society of Cinematographers Awards
Awards for best cinematography
Awards established in 1986